Rumyan Khristov (born 8 July 1954) is a Bulgarian rower.

Khristov was born in 1954. He competed in the men's coxless four event at the 1976 Summer Olympics. He competed in the 1979 World Rowing Championships in the men's eight and the team came tenth.

References

External links
 

1954 births
Living people
Bulgarian male rowers
Olympic rowers of Bulgaria
Rowers at the 1976 Summer Olympics
Place of birth missing (living people)